Muingmak Island is an uninhabited island in the Qikiqtaaluk Region of Nunavut, Canada. It is located in the Labrador Sea, off southeastern Baffin Island's Cumberland Peninsula. Ilikok Island is in the immediate vicinity.

References

Islands of Baffin Island
Islands of the Labrador Sea
Uninhabited islands of Qikiqtaaluk Region